Oregocerata submontana is a species of moth of the family Tortricidae. It is found in Venezuela.

The length of the forewings is about 10.5 mm. The ground colour of the forewings is whitish, suffused with brown specks. The hindwings are white, strigulated (finely streaked) with pale grey brown in the anteroterminal area.

Etymology
The species name refers to the submontane distribution of the species.

References

Moths described in 2005
Euliini
Moths of South America